The 1956 Giro d'Italia was the 39th edition of the Giro d'Italia, one of cycling's Grand Tours. The Giro started off in Milan on 19 May with a  flat stage and concluded back in Milan with a  relatively flat mass-start stage on 10 June. Sixteen teams entered the race, which was won by Luxembourgian Charly Gaul of the Faema team. Second and third respectively were Italian riders Fiorenzo Magni and Agostino Coletto.

Gaul took the lead in the legendary stage up Monte Bondone, where under a snow storm he won with an 8-minute margin over runner up Alessandro Fantini. This edition is unique since there were two Mountains Classification winners. There were two awards for the Dolomites and the Apennine mountains, the winners were Charly Gaul and Federico Bahamontes respectively.

Teams

Fifteen teams were invited by the race organizers to participate in the 1957 edition of the Giro d'Italia. Each team sent a squad of seven riders, which meant that the race started with a peloton of 105 cyclists. From the riders that began the race, 43 made it to the finish in Milan.

The teams entering the race were:

Pre-race favorites

The race was thought to be more open in previous years due to notable absences of top riders like Louison Bobet due to sickness, 1950 winner Hugo Koblet as he was recovering from a back injury and desired to focus on the Tour de France, Stan Ockers, Ferdinand Kübler, and Raphaël Géminiani, along with the innovations regarding the race route. A Feuille d'Avis de Neuchatel writer felt that the race would offer a great opportunity for the younger riders to succeed as the previous great riders like Coppi are getting too old. Previous year's winner Fiorenzo Magni (Nivea-Fuchs) was one of the older generation of riders to enter the race in great form, coming off of a win at the Tour of Piedmont. In addition, Magni had announced that this would be his last Giro as he would retire as the season's end.  The writer continued naming young Italians with potential to contend like Gastone Nencini (Leo–Chlorodont), following his performance in last Giro, amateur road race champion Sante Ranucci (Legnano), and Aldo Moser (Torpado). Jean Brankart lead the primarily Belgian Eldorado team and was viewed as a rider who would win a Tour de France. Some viewed Charly Gaul (Faema) as a favorite to contend for the overall. Spanish contenders were thought to be climber Federico Bahamontes (Girardengo), while sprinter Miguel Poblet (Faema) was thought to be a favorite for the flatter stages.

Route and stages

The route was revealed on 24 February 1956. The race contained eight stages with mountains, which contained sixteen categorized climbs. The race route all together contained 3 rest days and 23 stages across 25 days of racing, of which 18 were mass-start stages, two individual time trials, one team time trial event, and one individual time trial run as a relay. The relay event took place in San Marino. The second day of racing featured a split stage where the second half was a team time trial that was contested at night to not interfere with a local football match that was happening in the afternoon. The planned tenth stage from Salerno to Frascati was deemed an "electoral stage" at the route's announcement and was chosen to be removed because it fell on the day of Italian municipal elections. Three new Dolomite mountains were climbed during this edition of the race: Monte Bondone, San-Pellegrino, and Vallès ( meters). Eleven categorized climbs from the Apennines were included in the race route, with the Pian di Creto being utilized in the second stage. For the first time in race history, the cities of Lecco, Rapallo, Salice Terme were stops for the Giro.

When interviewed about the route several current and former riders said. The route was thought to be difficult.

Classification leadership

One jersey was worn during the 1956 Giro d'Italia. The leader of the general classification – calculated by adding the stage finish times of each rider – wore a pink jersey. This classification is the most important of the race, and its winner is considered as the winner of the Giro.

There were three mountains classifications in the 1956 Giro d'Italia, one for the Dolomites, Apennines, and one for the highest mountain in the race, the Passo dello Stelvio. The rider that was the first over the Stelvio was Ignis' Aurelio Del Rio. Although no jersey was awarded, there was also one classification for the teams, in which the teams were awarded points for their rider's performance during the stages.

Final standings

General classification

Trofeo Dolomiti

Trofeo Appennini

Intermediate sprints classification

Trofeo della plata

Team classification

References

Footnotes

Citations

Bibliography

 

1956
1956 in road cycling
May 1956 sports events in Europe
June 1956 sports events in Europe
1956 Challenge Desgrange-Colombo